Type 2 inflammation is a pattern of immune response. Its physiological function is to defend the body against helminths, but a dysregulation of the type 2 inflammatory response has been implicated in the pathophysiology of several diseases.

Molecular biology 
IL-25, IL-33, and TSLP are alarmins released from damaged epithelial cells. These cytokines mediate the activation of type 2 T helper cells (Th2 cells), type 2 innate lymphoid cells (ILC2 cells), and dendritic cells. Th2 cells and ILC2 cells secrete IL-4, IL-5 and IL-13.

IL-4 further drives CD4+ T cell differentiation towards the Th2 subtype and induces isotype switching to IgE in B cells. IL-4 and IL-13 stimulate trafficking of eosinophils to the site of inflammation, while IL-5 promotes both eosinophil trafficking and production.

Dysregulation in human disease 
Type 2 inflammation has been implicated in several chronic diseases: 

 Asthma
 Atopic dermatitis
 Chronic sinusitis with nasal polyps
 Eosinophilic esophagitis

Persons with one type 2 inflammatory disease are more likely to have other type 2 inflammatory diseases.

Pharmacological targets 
Several medicines have been developed that target mediators of type 2 inflammation:

 IL-4-specific blockers:
 Altrakincept
 Pascolizumab
 IL-5-specific blockers:
 Benralizumab
 Mepolizumab
 Reslizumab
 IL-13-specific blockers:
 Lebrikizumab
 Tralokinumab
 Dual IL-4 and IL-13 blockers:
 Dupilumab
 IgE-blockers:
 Ligelizumab
Omalizumab

References 

Immunology
Asthma
Atopic dermatitis